Shabat is a surname. People with the name include:

 Asael Ben Shabat (born 1988), an Israeli footballer 
 George Shabat, after whom the Shabat polynomial is named
 Shlomi Shabat (born 1954), an Israeli vocalist 

Shabat is also the name of a city in Turkmenistan:
 Shabat, Turkmenistan

See also

Sabbat (disambiguation)
Szabat

Hebrew-language surnames
Jewish surnames